Robert Hoole Sherwin, Jr. (born May 13, 1951) is an American businessman and winner of the Frances Pomeroy Naismith Award. A graduate of the United States Military Academy, he was most recently the Chief Operating Officer of Zenger Folkman.

Early life 
Sherwin was born in 1951 in St. Louis, Missouri, to Robert Sherwin Sr. and Jeanne Sherwin (née Davis). He is the third of five children, and the only boy. Sherwin moved with his family to Southern California, where he attended middle school and high school.

He attended Katella High School in Anaheim, California, where he excelled academically and in both basketball and baseball.  His senior year he led the basketball team to the 2-A championships, where Katella played (and ultimately lost to) Verbum Dei, 90-87, "in what some consider the greatest basketball title game in Southern Section history." He played basketball at Katella under coach Tom Danley, one of the most successful high school basketball coaches in California history.

West Point and the Army 

Sherwin attended the United States Military Academy at West Point, New York, and graduated in 1973. He was a member of the Black Knights basketball team, and started his sophomore through senior years.  As a sophomore, he played under Army head coach Bobby Knight, who left after that year to coach at Indiana University. As a junior and senior, Sherwin played for the former Villanova assistant basketball coach Dan Dougherty. Sherwin was the West Point team captain, and recipient of the 1972-1973 Frances Pomeroy Naismith Award as the best player in the nation under six feet tall.  In both his junior and senior years at West Point, Sherwin was also named to the All-Metropolitan New York basketball team and to the Academic All-American basketball team, and was one of five Division I players to receive an NCAA post-graduate scholarship for academic and athletic achievements.

Following his graduation from West Point, Sherwin went on to achieve the rank of captain in the Army. During his service, he played on the All Armed Forces basketball team and was named to the AAU All-American basketball team in 1977. His primary duty in the Army was as an air defense missile systems officer (Improved Hawk). Though he was stationed all over the world, it was during his time on assignment to Key West, Florida, that he met his wife, Susan Sherwin (née Perdue), who was an officer in the Navy also stationed in Key West.

Post-graduate studies and career 
Sherwin earned a Master of Business Administration in finance from the University of Michigan in 1981, and in his early career, was a design engineer at Ford Motor Company, a systems consultant at Deloitte, Haskins & Sells, and the vice president and controller of Oral-B Laboratories. His business background also includes extensive experience in software and Web application businesses. He was the co-founder and CEO of both FlipDog.com and WhizBang! Labs. FlipDog, an online recruiting website, was named by PC Magazine as one of the Best 100 sites on the Web. Sherwin is also a co-founder and former board member of TexSEM Labs, the world's leading supplier of EBSD systems used to analyze the microstructure of crystalline materials, and LiveWire Innovations, a developer of diagnostic equipment used to locate electrical faults in complex live wire networks.

Sherwin has spent more than 30 years as an executive, leader, coach, and mentor in some of the world's largest and most successful training and development companies. Most recently he was the COO at Zenger Folkman, one of the world's premier leadership development companies. He is a co-author of the best-selling leadership book, How To Be Exceptional: Drive Leadership Success by Magnifying Your Strengths (McGraw-Hill, 2012). Sherwin was the CEO of Kaset International, the SVP of Operations and CFO of AchieveGlobal, and the CFO of Zenger-Miller. He was also the President of Industrial Training Zone, a groundbreaking provider of Web-delivered technical training in PLC's and motion control.

Family 
Sherwin is married to Susan Sherwin.  They have four children and 9 grandchildren.

References 

1951 births
Living people
Army Black Knights men's basketball players
Basketball players from Anaheim, California
Basketball players from St. Louis
Guards (basketball)
Ross School of Business alumni
American men's basketball players